"Number Nine (Japanese ver.) / Kioku: Kimi ga Kureta Michishirube" is the eighth Japanese single by South Korean girl group T-ara. The release is a double A-side single, a first for the group, encompassing the Japanese-language version of "Number Nine" from their Again EP, and  the theme song to the film Jinx!!! starring member Hyo-min. The single was released on November 20, 2013, through EMI Records Japan.

Packaging
The single will be released in four different types: two CD+DVD limited editions that come in a special paper jacket, a regular edition, and a X-mas edition that comes with a remix album and a DVD, packaged in a box with six "T-ara santa ver." rubber key holders. All editions of the single come with a trading card with a serial code, chosen randomly out of seven types.

Composition
The "T-ara Party Non Stop Remix" by DJ Takao Fukushima is composed of ten songs spanning 45 minutes: "Bo Peep Bo Peep (Japanese ver.)", "Yayaya (Japanese ver.)", "Lovey-Dovey (Japanese ver.)", "Roly-Poly (Japanese ver.)", "Wei Ironi (Japanese ver.)", "Bye Bye (Japanese ver.)", "Hajimete no You ni (Japanese ver.)", "Target", "Bunny Style!" and "Deja-Vu".

Track listing

Charts

Sales

References

2013 singles
T-ara songs
Japanese-language songs
2013 songs